Life Reaper is the third studio album by the American metalcore group I, the Breather. It was released on July 15, 2014 by  Sumerian Records.  It was produced by band and Century band members Ricky Armellino, Grant McFarland, Carson Slovak.

Background and production
The album is the third from the group, who began making music in 2009. I, the Breather produced the album alongside Century bandmates Ricky Armellino, Grant McFarland, Carson Slovak.

Music style
Big Cheese says "they're a five-piece who can be described as metalcore with djent and progressive elements thrown in."

Critical reception

Life Reaper was welcomed with two positive reviews. In a four star review from Revolver, Jeff Perlah averring, "Life is good when I The Breather get down to business." Amy Sciarretto claims the project features some "metallic vigor... with real, flesh and blood passion", bequeathing the album a seven out of ten on behalf of Outburn. In a seven out of ten review by Big Cheese, Lais Martins Waring describing, "Their songs are heavy, and the combination of riffs and catchy choruses is a winning one."

Track listing

Personnel
The credit have been adapted from AllMusic.

I, the Breather
Shawn Spann – vocals
Chase Kozlowski – lead guitar
Kyle Bowman – lead guitar
Conor Hesse – bass guitar
Aaron Ovecka – drums
Producer(s)
Ricky Armellino
I, the Breather
Grant McFarland
Carson Slovak
Other musicians
Ricky Armellino – featured artist
Technical
Grant McFarland – engineer
Carson Slovak – engineer
Miscellaneous
Daniel McBride – artwork, layout
Orie McGinness – photography
T.D. Wehle – band photo

Chart performance

References

2014 albums
I, the Breather albums
Sumerian Records albums